Erin Elizabeth Finn  known as Erin Elizabeth, is an American conspiracy theorist, alternative health advocate, and blogger, who blogs under the name Health Nut News, and has been called one of the "disinformation dozen" responsible for 65% of Covid-19 anti-vaccine misinformation and conspiracy theories on the internet and social media, according to a report by the Center for Countering Digital Hate (CCDH) in 2021.

Career

Activist
Finn runs a website called Health Nut News.

By February 2019, Pinterest had banned links to Health Nut News for their promotion of false and dangerous health information.

On 13 May 2021, Facebook banned her personal and professional accounts as well as her 16 groups, for (according to an off-the-record source): "spammy and inauthentic behavior they relied on to build their audience. They misled people about the popularity of their posts and used fake accounts to spam people and evade our enforcement". YouTube removed her account in September 2021 for breaking its COVID-19 misinformation policies.

Finn is "known for sharing antisemitic content". She receives affiliate marketing income for promoting disinformation videos.

Personal life
Elizabeth is professionally associated with and the romantic partner of Joseph Mercola, who has been described as "a major funder of the anti-vax movement who has made millions from selling alternative health supplements online." She is based in Ormond Beach, Florida.

References

1970 births
Living people
American anti-vaccination activists
Pseudoscientific diet advocates
American conspiracy theorists
American women bloggers
American bloggers
Activists from Florida
21st-century American women